The 1995–96 Croatian Football Cup was the fifth edition of Croatia's football knockout competition. Hajduk Split were the defending champions, and the cup was won by Croatia Zagreb.

Calendar

First round

|}

Second round

|}

Quarter-finals

|}

Semi-finals

First legs

Second legs

Croatia Zagreb won 5–2 on aggregate.

Varteks won 5–1 on aggregate.

Final

First leg

Second leg

Croatia Zagreb won 3–0 on aggregate.

See also
1995–96 Croatian First Football League

External links
Official website 
1995–96 in Croatian football at Rec.Sport.Soccer Statistics Foundation
1996 Croatian Cup Final at Rec.Sport.Soccer Statistics Foundation

Croatian Football Cup seasons
Croatian Cup, 1995-96
Croatian Cup, 1995-96